Naina Sharma is an Indian sociologist and Professor in the Department of Sociology, Rajasthan University.

References 
http://www.andhrabank.in/english/profile_nsharma.html

External links 

 http://www.uniraj.ac.in/

http://www.unitedbankofindia.com/english/home.aspx http://www.unitedbankofindia.com/

1953 births
Living people
Indian sociologists
University of Rajasthan alumni
Academic staff of the University of Rajasthan
Indian women sociologists
Educators from Rajasthan
Women educators from Rajasthan